Mahindra Renault Limited was a joint venture between India's largest utility vehicle manufacturer Mahindra & Mahindra Limited & Renault S.A. of France (51% & 49% respectively). The joint venture was formed in 2007. On 15 April 2010 Mahindra & Mahindra and Renault together announced restructuring plans by which Mahindra would buy Renault's share in the joint venture and Renault would continue to provide the support for M&M through license agreement and continue to be supplier of key components.

Manufacturing facilities
Mahindra Renault Limited currently has a manufacturing plant in Nashik, Maharashtra with a capacity of 50,000 vehicles per year. Renault-Nissan have invested Rs 4,500 Crores to build a manufacturing plant in Chennai which will have a capacity of 400,000 vehicles per annum divided equally between Mahindra Renault Limited and Nissan Motor India Private Limited.

Models

The Renault Logan was launched 2007 and became the Mahindra Verito after the ending of the join venture in 2010.

Sales and service network
Mahindra Renault Limited uses Mahindra & Mahindra Limited's network for the sales and service of Renault branded vehicles in India. It currently has more than 140 dealerships across 125 cities in 24 states and 3 Union Territories of India.

See also 
Mahindra & Mahindra Limited
Renault S.A.
Automotive industry in India

References

External links
Mahindra Official Website

Motor vehicle manufacturers of India
Companies based in Nashik
Indian companies established in 2007
Mahindra Group
Indian companies disestablished in 2010
2007 establishments in Maharashtra
2010 disestablishments in India